Javier Alejandro Rabbia (born 21 September 1983 in Pilar, Argentina) is an Argentine footballer. 
He currently plays as a midfielder for Atlético Balboa.

References

1983 births
Living people
Association football midfielders
Argentine footballers
Argentine expatriate footballers
Atlético Balboa footballers
Expatriate footballers in El Salvador
Club Atlético Fénix players